Aurecon Group Pty. Ltd.  is an engineering, management, design, planning, project management, consulting and advisory company based in Australia, with operations in the Australia, New Zealand and South East Asia.

History 
Formed through the merger of three engineering consultancies, Africon, Connell Wagner and Ninham Shand, Aurecon has over 6,500 staff members. The company operates in 28 countries across Africa, Asia-Pacific and the Middle East.

Africon was formed in 1935. The original business, Van Wyk en Louw Consulting, grew as one of the 'top 5' engineering consulting firms under apartheid, winning lucrative government contracts including management of 'townships' before changing its name to Africon during South Africa's transformation to democracy. At the time of the merger, Africon was ranked amongst the world’s top 200 international design firms and was South Africa’s largest engineering company. The organisation operated in both the public and private sectors within the fields of transportation, property, municipal services, energy and mining.

Connell Wagner was one of Asia Pacific’s largest multi-disciplinary engineering consultancies, with a history spanning more than 75 years. The firm provided a broad range of professional technical services across several market sectors, namely buildings, industrial, transportation, urban development, water, international development, environment, energy, telecommunications and defence.

Established in 1935, Ninham Shand was one of South Africa’s leading, privately owned companies of consulting engineers and environmental scientists. The organisation offered consulting services in areas including water resources and supply, heavy engineering, purification, infrastructure services, structures and buildings, transportation and roads, and environmental science.

In October 2019, Aurecon decided to demerge its African business.

Notable projects
The company delivers project design and management across twelve markets; aviation, built environment, construction, data and telecommunications, defence, education and research, energy, health, manufacturing, resources, transport and water.

Major projects in Asia
Waigani National Courts Complex, Papua New Guinea
City of Dreams Casino, Macau
Chek Lap Kok, Passenger Terminal Building Hong Kong Airport, Hong Kong
Fusionopolis, Singapore
Pha Lai II Power Plant, Vietnam
Landmark 81, Vietnam
Rural Water Supply and Sanitation Program, East Timor
The Sail At Marina Bay, Singapore

Major projects in Australia/New Zealand
Queen Elizabeth II Courts of Law, Brisbane
Sunshine Coast University Hospital
West Gate Tunnel, Melbourne
Caulfield to Dandenong line Level Crossing Removal Project, Melbourne
Dalrymple Bay Coal Terminal, Hay Point
Eden Park Stadium, Auckland
Eureka Tower, Melbourne
Bendigo Bank Headquarters, Victoria
Huntly e3p Combined Cycle Power Station, Huntly
Luggage Point Water Treatment Plant, Queensland
Melbourne Cricket Ground
Northern Busway, Auckland
Optus Earth Satellite Station, Regency Park, South Australia
Adelaide Entertainment Centre redevelopment
Adelaide Festival Centre expansion
Kogan Creek Solar Boost Project
Te Puni Village, Victoria University of Wellington

Engineering and technical services

Mechanical engineering
Electrical engineering
Civil engineering
Structural engineering
Process / Chemical engineering
Project management
Surveying
Geotechnical engineering
Metallurgical / Material science
Environmental engineering
Environmental consulting, planning and approvals
Mathematics / Statistics
Transportation planning
Asset Management

References

External links
Aurecon Official Website

Australian companies established in 2009
Construction and civil engineering companies of Australia
Construction and civil engineering companies established in 2009
International engineering consulting firms
Engineering consulting firms of Australia